Qazi Jahan (also Romanized as Qāẕī Jahān) is a village in Qazi Jahan Rural District of Howmeh District, Azarshahr County, East Azerbaijan province, Iran. At the 2006 census, its population was 3,128 in 874 households. The following census in 2011 counted 3,283 people in 1,030 households. The latest census in 2016 showed a population of 3,359 people in 1,107 households; it was the largest village in its rural district.

References 

Azarshahr County

Populated places in East Azerbaijan Province

Populated places in Azarshahr County